Net5 is a Dutch free-to-cable commercial TV channel and is part of Talpa TV, formerly a part of SBS Broadcasting B.V. and now owned by Talpa Network. Other channels of the group in the Netherlands are SBS6, Veronica, and SBS9. It is aimed at high-educated female viewers. The station broadcasts various series, reality shows, and films.

History 
Net5 was launched by the SBS Broadcasting Group as their second commercial channel in the Netherlands next to SBS6. The head of SBS was Fons van Westerloo who left the company to work until 31 January 2008 to head the main competitor RTL Nederland (part of the RTL Group). Van Westerloo announced the new broadcast on 4 December 1998. It was supposed to become a commercial version of the Netherlands Public Broadcasting. Net5 was launched on 1 March 1999 and the first broadcast was the film Braveheart.

Since there were not that many commercial channels at the time, the Net5 brand was partly chosen to compete directly with the RTL 5 channel. The goal was for viewers to put Net5 on position 5 of their remote control settings instead of the older channel RTL 5. But research showed that more people would place RTL 5 on five, and Net5 on position nine.

From January 2000 to August 2002, Net5 shared its channel with the children's channel Kindernet. Kindernet broadcast from the early morning until 15.00.

The German ProSiebenSat.1 Media took over the parent company, SBS Broadcasting Group, on 27 June 2007. In 2011, all of SBS's activities in the Netherlands (through SBS Broadcasting B.V.), including the three TV stations (SBS6, Net5 and Veronica), the two TV guides (Veronica Magazine and Totaal TV), production, design and text activities were sold to a joint venture between Sanoma Media Netherlands (67%) and Talpa Holding (33%).

On 10 April 2017, Talpa Holding acquired a 67% stake from Sanoma Media Netherlands.

Programming 
Net5 is a television station aimed at high-educated female viewers. The station broadcasts various series, reality shows and films.

Series 

 $#*! My Dad Says
 2 Broke Girls
 2 Nuts and a Richard!
 3 lbs
 3rd Rock from the Sun
 666 Park Avenue
 90210
 Accidentally on Purpose
 According to Jim
 Alcatraz
 All About the Andersons
 Ally McBeal
 Amas de Casa Desesperadas
 American Crime Story
 American Dad!
 Angel
 Angela's Eyes
 Army Wives
 Archer
 Baby Daddy
 Beauty & the Beast
 Being Erica
 Betty in New York
 Big Love
 Bob's Burgers
 Body of Proof
 Boomtown
 Buffy the Vampire Slayer
 Bull
 Carnivàle
 Caroline in the City
 Castle
 Charmed
 Chicago Fire
 Chicago Med
 Chicago P.D.
 CSI: Crime Scene Investigation
 CSI: Miami
 CSI: NY
 Code Black
 Close to Home
 Cold Case
 Common Law
 Conviction
 Cougar Town
 Crash Canyon
 Criminal Minds
 Crossbones
 Crossing Jordan
 Desperate Housewives Africa
 Dallas
 Dawson's Creek
 Desperate Housewives
 Dirt
 Dirty Sexy Money
 Doc
 Early Edition
 Ed
 Eastwick
 Elementary
 Eleventh Hour
 Eli Stone
 Emily Owens, M.D.
 ER
 Evelien
 Everwood
 Everyday Gourmet with Justine Schofield
 Everybody Hates Chris
 Extant
 Family Guy
 Fleabag
 Forever
 Freaks and Geeks
 Friends
 Fringe
 Futurama
 Fugget About It
 GCB
 Ghost Whisperer
 A Gifted Man
 Gilmore Girls
 Gone
 Gossip Girl
 Goudkust
 Grand Designs
 Grey's Anatomy
 Happily Divorced
 Hart of Dixie
 Hawaii Five-0
 Hawthorne
 Heavy
 Home and Away
 Hostages
 Hotel Babylon
 House
 How to Get Away with Murder
 I'm with Her
 Jane the Virgin
 Jesse
 Judging Amy
 Justice
 King
 King & Maxwell
 King of the Hill
 Law & Order
 Law & Order: Criminal Intent
 Law & Order: Special Victims Unit
 Law & Order: Trial by Jury
 Law & Order: UK
 Lost
 Love, Inc.
 Love My Way
 Lovespring International
 Lupin the 3rd Part IV: The Italian Adventure
 Madam Secretary
 Major Crimes
 Manifest
 McLeod's Daughters
 Medium
 Men In Trees
 Missing
 Miss Farah
 Mistresses
 Mistresses UK
 Monk
 Moonlight
 NCIS
 NCIS: Los Angeles
 NCIS: New Orleans
 New Amsterdam
 Newton's Cradle
 Nip/Tuck
 Notes from the Underbelly
 Numbers
 October Road
 Off the Map
 Once Upon a Time
 One Tree Hill
 Packed To The Rafters
 Pan Am
 Person of Interest
 Poldark
 Private Practice
 Privileged
 Providence
 Pulling
 Pushing Daisies
 Raising the Bar
 Ready Steady Cook
 Reign
 Related
 Revenge
 Ringer
 Rick and Morty
 Rizzoli & Isles
 Rita Rocks
 Robot Chicken
 Rookie Blue
 Roseanne
 Rules of Engagement
 Samantha Who?
 Scandal
 Secret Bridesmaids' Business
 Sex and the City
 Smallville
 Solar Opposites
 South Park
 Spin City
 Star Trek: Voyager
 Station 19
 Strong Medicine
 Suddenly Susan
 Summerland
 Supernatural
 Switched at Birth
 Shenmue: The Animation
 Take Two
 The Blacklist
 The Class
 The Closer
 The Defenders
 The Doctors
 The Forgotten
 The Good Wife
 The Guardian
 The L Word
 The Listener
 The Mysteries of Laura
 The Nine
 The O.C.
 The Odd Couple
 The Palace
 The Rookie
 The Shannara Chronicles
 The Sopranos
 The Vampire Diaries
 The War at Home
 The Whole Truth
 The X-Files
 Two Guys and a Girl
 Two Twisted
 Ugly Betty
 Undercovers
 What About Brian
 Who's the Boss?
 Wildfire
 Will & Grace
 Without A Trace
 Women's Murder Club
 Yes, Dear
 Your Honor

Reality shows 

 Airline
 Amish in the City
 Bondi Rescue
 Extreme Makeover: Home Edition
 Gordon Ramsay's 24 Hours to Hell and Back
 Got to Dance
 Hell's Kitchen USA
 Het Blok
 House Rules
 HGTV Design Star
 I Shouldn't Be Alive
 Junior MasterChef
 Junior MasterChef Australia
 Kourtney and Khloé Take Miami
 Little People, Big World
 MasterChef
 MasterChef: The Professionals
 MasterChef Australia
 MasterChef Australia: The Professionals
 MasterChef Australia All-Stars
 MasterChef Canada
 MasterChef Junior USA
 MasterChef South Africa
 MasterChef USA
 Mobbed
 Mr. Romance
 My Kitchen Rules
 My Kitchen Rules NZ
 Peking Express
 Pineapple Dance Studios
 Say Yes to the Dress
 Secret Story (2011)
 Surf Patrol
 The Bachelor
 The Bachelorette
 The Block
 The Block NZ
 The Chopping Block
 The Island
 The Little Couple
 The Only Way Is Essex
 The Real Housewives
 Trinny & Susannah Undress...
 What Not to Wear

Series and reality shows which are currently programmed 

 Bull
 Charmed
 Chicago Fire
 Chicago Med
 Chicago P.D.
 Code Black
 Criminal Minds
 Elementary
 Fleabag
 Gordon Ramsay's 24 Hours to Hell and Back
 Grey's Anatomy
 Hawaii Five-0
 House Rules
 Law & Order: Special Victims Unit
 MasterChef Australia
 My Kitchen Rules
 NCIS
 NCIS: Los Angeles
 NCIS: New Orleans
 Secret Bridesmaids' Business
 Station 19
 The Block NZ
 Your Honor

References

External links 
 

Television channels in the Netherlands
Television channels and stations established in 1999
Mass media in Amsterdam
1999 establishments in the Netherlands
Talpa Network